Domalapenta is a village of Mahabubnagar district in the Indian state of Telangana. It is near to Srisailam Dam and the temple of Srisailam.

Domalapenta is a village on the left side of Srisailam Project, situated in Nallamala Hills of Mahaboobnagar district, Telangana, India. It is on the left bank of River Krishna, about 186 km south of common capital Hyderabad.

References

Villages in Mahbubnagar district